is the 14th single by Japanese singer/songwriter Chisato Moritaka. The lyrics were written by Moritaka and the music was composed by Yuichi Takahashi. The single was released by Warner Music Japan on October 25, 1991. The '70s-style rock song was used as an image song for the 1991 FIVB Volleyball Men's World Cup, which was held in Tokyo.

Chart performance 
"Fight!!" peaked at No. 10 on Oricon's singles chart and sold 269,000 copies, being certified Gold by the RIAJ.

Other versions 
Moritaka re-recorded the song as a slow ballad and uploaded the video on her YouTube channel on September 24, 2012. This version is also included in Moritaka's 2013 self-covers DVD album Love Vol. 2.

Track listing

Personnel 
 Chisato Moritaka – vocals
 Yuichi Takahashi – keyboards, synthesizer programming, acoustic guitar, backing vocals
 Yasuaki Maejima – piano
 Hiroyoshi Matsuo – acoustic guitar
 Hideo Saitō – synthesizer programming, backing vocals

Chart positions

Certification

References

External links 
 
 
 

1991 singles
1991 songs
Japanese-language songs
Chisato Moritaka songs
Songs with lyrics by Chisato Moritaka
Warner Music Japan singles